Malal may refer to:
 Malal, Rezvanshahr
 Malal, a fictional god of Chaos in the Warhammer Fantasy universe
 Malaal (film), 2019 Indian romantic drama by Mangesh Hadawale